Sione Tupou Mateialona was a politician from Tonga who served as Prime Minister of Tonga from January 1905 to 30 September 1912.

References 

Prime Ministers of Tonga